Pain Jadeh (also Romanized as Pā’īn Jādeh) is a village in Nowkand Kola Rural District, in the Central District of Qaem Shahr County, Mazandaran Province, Iran. At the 2006 census, its population was 504, in 129 families.

References 

Populated places in Qaem Shahr County